Yoda Press is a publishing house in India, with its headquarters located at Shahpur Jat, Siri Fort, New Delhi.

History
Yoda Press was awarded the Publisher of the Year Prize in 2016 at the Publishing Next Conference, held annually in Goa, India. Yoda Press was founded by Arpita Das in 2004 as a house that would build lists which reflected the non-mainstream, alternative and yet equally vital contemporary reality of the Indian subcontinent. Five Yoda Press titles were cited by the Supreme Court of India during its judgement in 2018 that decriminalised homosexuality in the country. 

In 2015 the Press signed up for a joint academic imprint with Sage Publishing India, and more recently, Yoda Press has established another joint imprint with Simon & Schuster India for trade books with the Press's characteristic political edge. The first title on this joint imprint, Azadi: A Graphic Biography of Bhagat Singh (in reference to Shaheed Bhagat Singh, the famous revolutionary martyr of India) will be published in April 2020.

Notable publications
Notable publications of Yoda Press:

References

Book publishing companies of India
Indian companies established in 2004
Publishing companies established in 2004
Companies based in New Delhi